Halim or Haleem is an Arabic masculine given name which means gentle, forbearing, mild, patient, understanding, indulgent, slow to anger.
In Islam, al-Halīm is one of the Names of God in Islam.

Abdul Halim or Abdel Halim or Abdelhalim or alternatives with Haleem mean servant of God, as thus described, and bearers of that name are listed on that page.

Halim is also used as an abbreviated version of "Abdul Halim", or independently, as a name given to a male.

Md Halim
 Halim (name)

Given name
 Abdul Halim of Kedah, Malaysian former King
 Halim Barakat, Syrian novelist
 Halim Benmabrouk, Algerian footballer
 Halim El-Dabh, American composer
 Halim Haryanto, Indonesian / American badminton player
 Halim Perdanakusuma, Indonesian aviator and national hero, after whom Halim Perdanakusuma International Airport is named
 Halim Medaci, Algerian footballer
 Said Halim Pasha, Ottoman Empire Grand Vizier
 Halim Saad, Malaysian businessman
 Halim Othman, Malaysian radio and television announcer

Last name
 Asma Halim, Egyptian writer and journalist
 Helmy Halim, Egyptian filmmaker
 Mustafa Ben Halim, ex-Prime Minister of Libya
 Rachman Halim, Indonesian businessman
 Norman Abdul Halim, Malaysian musician
 Edry Abdul Halim, Malaysian actor

Haleem

Given name
Haleem Brohi, Pakistani author
Haleem Chaudhri, Bengali cricketer

Surname
Aamer Haleem, Canadian radio and television personality
Mohammad Haleem, Pakistani judge

See also

 Haleem, a type of stew popular in the Middle East, Central Asia, and the Indian subcontinent
 Halima (disambiguation) or Halime and variants, feminine form of Halim

References 

Arabic masculine given names